The Northern Ireland Football League Charity Shield is the national association football super cup in Northern Ireland. It has been held on an occasional basis since its inauguration in 1992. Similar to the English FA Community Shield, it pits together the previous campaign's Irish League champions and Irish Cup winners, providing the opening match of the Irish League season.

Crusaders are the current holders, after they defeated Linfield 2–0 in the 2022 edition to win the competition for the first time.

Sponsorship
McEwan's Lager sponsored the competition between 1992 and 1994, and Wilkinson Sword were sponsors from 1998 until 2000, both of whom also sponsored other competitions in Irish League football. The proceeds from the 2014 and 2015 editions were donated to the Northern Ireland Hospice.

Format
The Shield is held in early August as a single match. In the 1992 and 1993 editions, the trophy was shared between the two competing sides for six months when both matches finished level at full-time. However, the rules were later changed to ensure an outright winner. In the 2014 edition, a penalty shoot-out was used to determine the winner when the match ended level after 90 minutes, without extra time being played.

Results
Key:

Performance by club

External links
 Charity Shield Archive at the Irish Football Club Project
Irish League Archive - Charity Shield

References

National association football supercups
Recurring sporting events established in 1992
Association football cup competitions in Northern Ireland